Warlock: The Armageddon is a 1993 American supernatural horror film directed by Anthony Hickox and produced by Peter Abrams. It is a sequel in title only to the 1989 film Warlock and stars Julian Sands, who returns in the title role as a warlock who attempts to free Satan from Hell.

Plot 
In the distant past, Druids have stopped the rise of Satan's son using six magical rune stones that create light to vanquish the darkness. While the Druids perform a ritual upon a woman Satan has selected, they are attacked by Christians who feel their work is Satanic. Most of the Druids die and the rune stones are scattered.

In the present, Kenny Travis and Samantha Ellison, a young man and woman, are in love but are having relationship issues. Their parents are Druids; while Samantha's father Ted Ellison is a priest and has neglected his responsibilities as a Druid, Kenny's father Will Travis kills Kenny so he can rise again with the aid of Druid magic to become a Druid warrior.

Elsewhere, Amanda Sloan, a young woman has possession of one of the rune stones due to it being passed down through her family. Amanda wears the stone to impress her date, but, as she looks out her kitchen window at the lunar eclipse, she rapidly becomes pregnant and gives birth to the Warlock, Satan's son. After the Warlock is reborn, he kills Amanda and then communicates with his father Satan. Using Amanda as a conduit, Satan tells the Warlock to find the other five rune stones. These have the power to summon him to Earth, but he has precisely six days to do this. The Warlock peels the flesh from Amanda's stomach and makes it into a map, enabling him to track the other runes.

Kenny is destined to be a Druid warrior, learns how to use his powers, and it is not long before his girlfriend Samantha joins him. They suffer persecution from the villagers but are protected by Ted. Meanwhile the Warlock gains the other rune stones to raise Satan from his prison to rule the world, murdering various people along the way.
 
Kenny and Samantha, who is wearing the final rune stone, fight the Warlock but he defeats and imprisons them and gains the runes which he uses to open a portal to Hell. As Satan rises, Kenny and Samantha use their powers to turn on the lights of a nearby truck. The Warlock screams in terror as he is killed and Satan is sent back to Hell, the two of them defeated by evil's ultimate enemy, light.

Cast

Soundtrack

The soundtrack was composed and conducted by Mark McKenzie. A soundtrack album was released on September 24, 1993, via Intrada Records label.

Reception 
Leonard Klady of Variety wrote that the film, though not narratively connected to Warlock, will satisfy fans of that film.  Compared to Sands, Klady called the rest of the cast bland.  Of Sands, he wrote, "Chewing up the landscape with great relish, Sands almost erases all thought of his colorless adversaries."  Kevin Thomas of the Los Angeles Times called it "too dreary to play even as camp".

References

External links 
 
 
 
 

1993 films
1993 horror films
1993 fantasy films
American supernatural horror films
American sequel films
1990s English-language films
Trimark Pictures films
Films about witchcraft
Films directed by Anthony Hickox
1990s American films